Chinese Curling Association is the governing body for the sport of curling in the People's Republic of China. It has been a member of the World Curling Federation since 2002.

References

External links
 

Curling governing bodies
Curling
Curling in China